The lion head symbol was introduced in 1986 as an alternative national symbol of Singapore. The lion head was chosen as a nice logo, as it best captures the characteristics of Singapore's reputation as a Lion City. It is used in less formal occasions mainly to promote Singapore's national identity.

When it was first unveiled, some sections of the public felt that it should have been facing rightwards to represent a more forward looking nature.  However, the original left-facing lion was maintained.

Origin
In the 13th-century Malay Annals, Sang Nila Utama, a prince from Palembang was shipwrecked and washed ashore to an island. There he saw a creature which he believed was a lion. So he named the island "Singa Pura" which means "Lion City" in Malay, from which the name Singapore was derived.

Meaning
According to the Singapore government:

Guidelines for use
Extracted from Guidelines on the use of National Symbols: The Singapore Lion Symbol (July 1999) published by the Ministry of Information, Communications and the Arts:

 Subject to approval, organisations can use the Singapore Lion Symbol for the purpose of identifying with the nation and with the endeavour to achieve excellence for Singapore.
 In application, the symbol should not be modified in any way. However, the symbol in outline, embossed or portrayed as a watermark, are acceptable forms of depiction. It should preferably face left and be used together with the word "Singapore".
 The symbol should preferably be in red on a white background or white on a red background. However, it may also appear in gold, silver or in the corporate colours of the user organisation. Users must ensure that the symbol is depicted only in one colour.

See also
 Republic of Singapore Air Force: Uses the lion head symbol in enclosed by a circle as a roundel

References

External links
The Singapore Infomap 

National symbols of Singapore
Symbols introduced in 1986